Kettle is a surname. Notable people bearing the name include:

Tilly Kettle (1735–1786), English painter
Rupert Alfred Kettle (1817–1894), British judge
Charles Kettle (1821–1862), New Zealand surveyor
Andrew Kettle (1833–1916), Irish politician
Frederick Kettle (1875-1951), English football player
Tom Kettle (1880–1916), Irish writer and politician
Rupert Kettle (cricketer) (1915–1985), English cricketer for Assam
Digger Kettle (1922–1999), British football player
Michael Kettle (born 1944), English cricketer
Martin Kettle (born 1949), British journalist 
Brian Kettle (born 1956), English football player
Alice Kettle (born 1961), English textile artist
Stephen Kettle (born 1966), British sculptor
Nicholas D. Kettle (born 1990), American politician

English-language surnames